Ritmo (Italian/Spanish for "rhythm") may refer to:

Automobiles
 Fiat Ritmo, a 1978–1988 Italian compact car
 Fiat Bravo, a 2007–2014 Italian compact hatchback, sold in Australia as the Fiat Ritmo

Music
 Ritmo (album), a 1983 album by Judie Tzuke
 "Ritmo" (song), a 2019 song by Black Eyed Peas and J Balvin

Other uses
 Ritmo (typeface), a 1955 typeface developed by Aldo Novarese